The Mission Diocese, officially the Evangelical Lutheran Mission Diocese of Finland, is an independent confessional Lutheran "ecclesial structure" in Finland. The Mission Diocese considers itself to be "part of ‘the one, holy, catholic and apostolic church’" to be "truly a church" and to act "fully independently as a church", although it has not applied for state-recognition as a registered religious community. The Mission Diocese has its origins in the conservative movements of the Evangelical Lutheran Church of Finland (ELCF) and it self-identifies as existing in the same continuum of Lutheran faith and congregational life of the ELCF whose spiritual heritage it cherishes, yet not being part of its administrative structures.

The Mission Diocese was founded in March 2013. Its first bishop, Risto Soramies, was consecrated on 4 May 2013.

The Evangelical Lutheran Mission Diocese of Finland shares altar and pulpit fellowship with those in the Communion of Nordic Lutheran Dioceses, in addition to being a member of the International Lutheran Conference.

Background 
The Mission Diocese was founded by the 22 congregations of the Luther Foundation Finland and three other Lutheran congregations in 2013. The Luther Foundation had been established in 1999, starting to celebrate the Divine Service on one location in Helsinki in 2000. By 2004, the Luther Foundation had become a supporting member of the Swedish Mission Province. Bishop Matti Väisänen had been consecrated in 2010 in order to serve the congregations in Finland, which soon led to his being defrocked by the ELCF whose pastor he was. In 2012, the ELCF archbishop expressed his wish that the Luther Foundation establish its own church body. The founding of the Ev. Luth. Mission Diocese of Finland in 2013 marked independence from the Mission Province of Sweden, although contacts remained close. The ELCF continued to defrock its pastors now serving in the Mission Diocese: Bishop Risto Soramies was defrocked on 9 October 2013 and Dean Juhana Pohjola on 5 August 2014. On 8 April 2015, the Cathedral Chapter of the ELCF Archdiocese of Turku defrocked five ELCF pastors for breaking their ordination vows by serving in the Mission Diocese that the ELCF viewed a de facto different church body.

The Mission Diocese was founded in response to the perceived secularisation and liberalisation of the Evangelical Lutheran Church of Finland and "to spread, maintain and renovate the true faith, to revive and strengthen Christian life and to implement Christian charity and diaconia" in Finland. According to the Mission Diocese, the ELCF had in many ways distanced itself from its doctrinal foundation, the Bible and the Lutheran Book of Concord. The Mission Diocese continues to serve those left "spiritually homeless" by the theological reforms in the ELCF. These comprise e.g. the acceptance of the ordination of women (1986), the exclusion of such men from ordination who will not co-operate liturgically with women pastors (2006) and the acceptance of same-sex relationships (2011). The Mission Diocese also reaches out to the unchurched and views the founding of Lutheran congregations as its principle in both domestic and foreign mission.

By the end of 2016, the number of Mission Diocese congregations has grown to 32 congregations and 4 missions.

Doctrine 
The Mission Diocese holds that "all teaching, practice and life should be tested, executed and guided by the word of God." The Mission Diocese recognises the Book of Concord as an accurate teaching of biblical doctrine.

Congregations 
As of 2016 the Mission Diocese has 32 organised congregations. In addition to this, Mass is celebrated on four other locations. Each congregation is part of one of the seven districts.

District of Tavastia
 Hämeenlinna: Matteuksen seurakunta
 Jyväskylä: Jesajan luterilainen seurakunta
 Lahti: Samuelin luterilainen seurakunta
 Tampere: Johanneksen seurakunta
District of Uusimaa
 Espoo: Pyhän Tuomaksen seurakunta
 Helsinki: Pyhän Markuksen luterilainen seurakunta
 Lohja: Pyhän Ristin luterilainen seurakunta
 Vantaa: Pyhän Kolminaisuuden luterilainen seurakunta
Eastern district
 Iisalmi: Danielin seurakunta
 Joensuu: Pyhän Nehemian luterilainen seurakunta
 Kitee
 Kuopio: Pyhän Pietarin luterilainen seurakunta
 Nurmes
Northern district
 Kajaani: Filippuksen seurakunta
 Kemi
 Oulu: Timoteuksen seurakunta
 Rovaniemi: Stefanoksen seurakunta
 Sodankylä: Elian seurakunta
Southeastern district
 Imatra: Joosuan seurakunta
 Kotka
 Kouvola: Pauluksen seurakunta
 Lappeenranta: Joonan seurakunta 
 Mikkeli: Tiituksen luterilainen seurakunta
 Savonlinna: Pyhän Jaakobin luterilainen seurakunta
Southwestern district
 Laitila: Aamoksen seurakunta
 Loimaa: Hyvän Paimenen luterilainen seurakunta
 Pori: Sakkeuksen seurakunta 
 Rauma: Pyhän Marian seurakunta
 Turku: Pyhän Paavalin luterilainen seurakunta
 Turku: Sankt Gabriels församling (Swedish)
Western district
 Jakobstad: Sankt Jakobs församling (Swedish)
 Kokkola: Andreaksen luterilainen seurakunta
 Pyhänkoski: Simeonin seurakunta
 Seinäjoki: Luukkaan seurakunta
 Vaasa: Mikaelin seurakunta
 Vaasa: Sankt Immanuels lutherska församling (Swedish)

International Contacts 
In December 2014, Bishop Soramies consecrated Robert Kaumba as Bishop of the Lutheran Evangelical Church in Africa—Zambia Diocese. The Lutheran Heritage Foundation and Lutherans in Africa are the Mission Diocese's partners in foreign mission.

The Mission Diocese declared altar and pulpit fellowship with the Mission Province of Sweden and the Evangelical Lutheran Diocese of Norway in 2015 and with Lutheran Church—Canada in 2017.

The Mission Diocese has also begun fellowship talks with the Evangelical Lutheran Church of England, the Independent Evangelical Lutheran Church in Germany, and The Union of Independent Evangelical Lutheran Congregations in Finland. It is also applying for membership in the International Lutheran Council.

References

External links 
 Evangelical Lutheran Mission Diocese of Finland Official Website

Lutheranism in Finland
Christian organizations established in 2013